Clydonodozus is a genus of crane fly in the family Limoniidae.

Species
C. abyssinicus Alexander, 1972
C. alexanderi Lindner, 1958
C. angustifasciatus Alexander, 1920
C. brevicellulus Alexander, 1920
C. cinereithorax Alexander, 1930
C. curvinervis Edwards, 1931
C. fulvithorax Alexander, 1926
C. fumicostatus Alexander, 1930
C. griseiceps de Meijere, 1916
C. guttatipennis (Karsch, 1888)
C. interruptus Alexander, 1920
C. multistriatus Enderlein, 1912
C. neavei Alexander, 1920
C. nilgiricus Alexander, 1953
C. pallens (van der Wulp, 1885)
C. pallidistigma Alexander, 1920
C. phaeosoma Alexander, 1970
C. puncticosta Alexander, 1920
C. punctulatus Enderlein, 1912
C. scalaris Alexander, 1963
C. schoutedeni Alexander, 1930
C. stuckenbergi Alexander, 1957
C. xanthopterus Alexander, 1938

References

Limoniidae
Nematocera genera